The FEU Tamaraws are the varsity teams of Far Eastern University in the University Athletic Association of the Philippines (UAAP). The collegiate women's varsity teams are called the Lady Tamaraws while the high school varsity teams are called the Baby Tamaraws.

History
Far Eastern University was one of the founding members of the National Collegiate Athletic Association (NCAA) of the Philippines in 1924. The team participated in the NCAA Philippines in 1929, then eventually withdrew in 1935 to join the Big 3 League composed of the universities which left the NCAA in 1932. Far Eastern University together with the University of the Philippines, University of Santo Tomas, and National University founded the University Athletic Association of the Philippines in 1938. FEU offers varsity sports in Basketball 5x5 and 3x3, Volleyball and beach volleyball, Football & futsal, cheerleading, badminton, tennis, swimming, Taekwondo, and table tennis, Chess, Track & Field.

Team mascot and colors

The Tamaraw is the mascot of all FEU athletic teams. Known scientifically as Bubalus mindorensis, it is a rare animal found only in the island of Mindoro. The local endemic animal was chosen originally by the FEU founder, Dr. Nicanor Reyes Sr., for his admiration of its strength and intelligence. The Tamaraw icon has eventually transformed into a nationalistic and culturally significant symbol for ferociousness. 

The team's color are that of the university, green and gold. With green representing hope, as quoted from the National Hero, Dr. Jose Rizal's "Fair hope of the Fatherland", and gold, representing the university's golden opportunity to serve the youth and country.

Sports

Basketball

FEU won their first men's and women's UAAP basketball championships in 1938–39 and 1950–1951, respectively. The Tamaraws have the most championships in the men's basketball division, having won 20 titles. FEU ranks second in total number of combined championships won in the juniors, women's, and men's basketball divisions. In Season 68, the FEU Tamaraws won their 19th title by sweeping the De La Salle Green Archers in their Best Of Three Championship Series. Played at The Araneta Coliseum on October 6, 2005.

In season 71, the Tamaraws finished the elimination round with 10 wins and 4 losses. They lost game one of the semifinals to the De La Salle Green Archers on September 11, 2008, then bowed out of contention three days later after losing game 2.

On October 15, 2014, the FEU Tamaraws lost their championship series against the NU Bulldogs in three games.

In Season 78 (2015–16), the Tamaraws claimed their 20th title in the men's basketball tournament. FEU won against UST in three games in their Finals series with Game 3 played on December 2, 2015 at the Mall of Asia Arena.

FEU Tamaraws recruits class of 2020

Notable players
Men's Division
 Johnny Abarrientos 
 Francis Adriano 
 Manuel Araneta 
 Mac Baracael
 Mac Belo 
 Mark Bringas
 Glenn Capacio 
 JR Cawaling
 Jeff Chan 
 Carl Bryan Cruz 
 Celino Cruz 
 Romy Diaz 
 Barkley Eboña
 Russel Escoto
 Benedict Fernandez
 Jorge Gallent 
 RR Garcia 
 Mark Isip 
 Denok Miranda 
 Victor Pablo
 Marc Pingris
 Roger Pogoy 
 Terrence Romeo 
 Arwind Santos
 Mike Tolomia 
 Ken Tuffin
 Turo Valenzona
 Jonas Villanueva

Retired numbers
Basketball
 Arwind Santos (19)  Three-time UAAP champion (2003,2004,2005); Three-Time UAAP Finals MVP; (2003,2004,2005); Two-Time UAAP MVP (2004 & 2005); Two-Time UAAP Defensive Player of the Year (2004 & 2005); Three-time UAAP Scoring Champion (2003,2004,2005) ; Three-time UAAP Rebounding Champion (2003,2004,2005); Two-time UAAP Blocking Champion (2004 & 2005);  2002 UAAP Rookie of the Year.2013 governors cup best player of the conference, 2013 PBA MVP
 Johnny Abarrientos (14) 1989 UAAP Rookie of the Year; Two-time UAAP champion (1991–1992); 1991 UAAP MVP; 1996 PBA MVP

Rivals
UE Red Warriors, were involved in the rivalry called the "Battle of the East" with the FEU Tamaraws. Both the Red Warriors and the Tamaraws dominated the UAAP basketball tournaments from the 1950s up to the late 1980s. The Tamaraws came out on top of this rivalry having won 20 titles to the 18 titles of the Red Warriors.
De La Salle Green Archers, the rivalry was sparked during the Finals of Season 54 (1991) when La Salle's win in game 1 (where La Salle was twice-to-beat) was protested by FEU after a Green Archer was admitted into the playing court after being disqualified. The UAAP Board upheld the protest and ordered the replay. La Salle did not show up, claiming to have won legitimately. This resulted in the awarding of the championship trophy to FEU by the UAAP Board (UAAP Board decided that if La Salle did not show up in Game 1, they won't in the knock out Game 2). La Salle responded with a victory parade that passed through the other seven UAAP schools. When they passed through the FEU campus, the motorcade was bombarded with debris. In Season 67 (2004), La Salle had to give up another trophy to FEU. Two Green Archers were found to have falsified documents. Thus the trophy was awarded again to FEU, who were the Finals opponent of La Salle. The rivalry is unofficially known as the "Battle of the Greens", because both teams sport green in their uniforms.

UAAP titles
 Men's basketball: 20 – 1938, 1939, 1947, 1950, 1956, 1961, 1972, 1973, 1976, 1979, 1980, 1981, 1983, 1991, 1992, 1997, 2003, 2004 , 2005, and 2015.
'Women's basketball: 11 – 1950, 1951, 1952, 1953, 1991, 1996, 1997, 1998, 2008, 2011 and 2012
Juniors' basketball: 9 – 1948, 1949, 1950, 1951, 1952, 1953, 1987, 2012, and 2016

Volleyball
The FEU Tamaraw Spikers won their first UAAP volleyball title in season 9 (1946–47), while the FEU Lady Tamaraw Spikers won their first in season 11 (1948–49). As of UAAP Season 75 the Tamaraws have won 25 UAAP volleyball titles while the Lady Tamaraws have 29 UAAP championships. The Tamaraw Spikers has the longest championship streak in the UAAP. They were champions for twelve consecutive seasons, from 1946 to 1957.

Rivals
 UST Growling Tigers and the FEU women's volleyball teams battled in the Finals for as long as 15 seasons (1988–2003), wherein 9 titles were won by the Lady Tamaraw Spikers.
 UP Fighting Maroons, considered one of the powerhouses in UAAP men's volleyball, ranks second to FEU (as of UAAP Season 69) in the number of men's volleyball championships. They won 9 titles. While FEU has 11 titles. The two teams competed for the men's volleyball championship in 8 seasons, 4 of which were won by the Tamaraws.

Notable players
 Geneveve Casugod
 Rachel Anne Daquis 
 Maica Morada 
 Bernadeth Pons 
 Cristina Salak 
 Rosemarie Vargas

 Bhen Henrick Presnede

 Beach volleyball
The school has both men's and women's beach volleyball teams.

Football
The FEU Tamaraw Booters, under coach Orlando Plagata, won their first title in the UAAP Football tournament in 1980–1981, while the FEU Lady Tamaraw Booters won their first title in 1983–1984. FEU ranks (as of UAAP Season 69) 2nd in terms of number of championships won in the said event since 1978.

FEU appeared in the event finals for as long as 27 seasons, wherein 2 men's football titles and 11 women's football titles were awarded to the Tamaraw Booters.

Outside the UAAP, the women's football team were also crowned champions for the first two editions of the PFF Women's Cup (2014, 2015). It has also competed in international tournaments such as in the 2015 HCM City International Women Football Tournament in Vietnam where it finished fourth out of four participating teams.

The FEU Lady Tamaraws Football Team*

Rivals
 Ateneo Blue Eagles started in 1983, the men's football rivalry lasted for 5 years, where 2 titles were won by FEU.
 De La Salle Green Archers, this FEU-DLSU football rivalry emerged in 1996, which then lasted for as long as 9 years. 5 titles were won by the FEU Lady Tamaraw Booters from the DLSU Lady Archers.

Track and Field
The FEU Charging Tamaraws won their first championship in track and field in UAAP Season 10 (1947–48), while the FEU Charging Lady Tamaraws won their first championship in UAAP Season 13 (1950–51). FEU currently ranks first, in terms of number of titles won in the UAAP track and field competition, with 57 titles, followed by the Ateneo Blue Eagles with 29 titles, and NU Bulldogs with 27 titles since the conception of the UAAP.

The Charging Lady Tamaraws currently own the longest winning streak in the said sport. They've been UAAP track and field champions for 7 consecutive seasons, and currently has the most titles in women's track and field with 30 titles, while the Charging Tamaraws, are also tops among participating universities in the sport, with 27 titles.

Notable athletes

FEU Cheering Squad

The FEU Cheering Squad consists of three major groups, that either perform during halftime performances in major games or events in the UAAP or other sport competitions participated by the university athletes (FEU Cheerdancers), lead the FEU crowd in cheering during the said events though the university's chants or cheers (FEU Boosters), and drum beats (FEU Drummers).FEU CheerdancersThe FEU Cheer Dancers are university's cheer dance group, consisting mainly of gymnasts and dancers. They participate in the UAAP Cheer Dance Competition (CDC), and other related exhibitions and competitions.FEU BoostersThe official cheerleaders of FEU, also known as "Boosters", is a supporting group for the varsity teams of the school. They're the group exceptionally with loud voices, and solid hand gestures, leading the crowd on every event on and off campus.FEU Drummers'The official cheer drummers of FEU. Formerly known as the "FEU Green Bisons", they are well trained in beating the drums. Works together with the FEU Boosters and FEU Cheerdancers, supporting their group and participates in school's varsity games.

Other notable alumni athletes

Retired jersey numbers
Basketball
 #14 – Johnny Abarrientos
 #19 – Arwind Santos

Volleyball
 #3 – Rachel Anne Daquis (jersey retirement scheduled during the UAAP Season 79 women's volleyball tournament)

Rankings in the UAAP
These are the rankings of the University in the UAAP events it is participating since 1986, the year the UAAP became an eight member-school league.

Seniors' events

Beach volleyball tournament in the 69th season was a demonstration event.

Poomsae became a regular event in the 76th season, was a demonstration sport in the 74th and 75th. See FEU Baby Tamaraws for FEU Junior RankingsChampionships tally
The University currently participates in 11 out of 16 events in the UAAP (as of UAAP Season 69).  Total number of championships won in the UAAP seniors division include both men's and women's teams championships.

The FEU Tamaraws were the first over-all league champions in the UAAP in 1948, making their first streak with 11 over-all championship titles which was later halted by the UST Growling Tigers in 1959. The FEU team last had their over-all UAAP championship title in 1982.See UAAP Overall Championship''

See also
University Athletic Association of the Philippines
FEU – Diliman
FEU Baby Tamaraws

References

External links

The UAAP:A Historical Account

 
University Athletic Association of the Philippines teams
Tamaraws
College sports teams in Metro Manila
Former National Collegiate Athletic Association (Philippines) teams